Enlinia is a genus of flies in the family Dolichopodidae. Flies in the genus are tiny, with a body length of around 1 mm. The genus is restricted to the New World. There are about 89 species described in the genus.

The genus was originally known as Collinellula, named by John Merton Aldrich in 1932. It was named in honor of J. E. Collin, who collected a specimen of the type species, Collinellula magistri (the specific name was also chosen to celebrate the ability of this collector). However, Collinellula was found to be preoccupied, so the genus was renamed to Enlinia by Aldrich in 1933, in honor of G. Enderlein, another collector of the type species.

Species

Enlinia acuticornis Robinson, 1969
Enlinia albipes Robinson, 1969
Enlinia angustifacies Robinson, 1969
Enlinia anomalipennis Robinson, 1969
Enlinia arborea Robinson, 1975
Enlinia arizonica Robinson, 1973
Enlinia armata Robinson, 1969
Enlinia atrata (Van Duzee, 1930)
Enlinia biobio Runyon & Pollet, 2019
Enlinia bova Runyon & Pollet, 2018
Enlinia brachychaeta Robinson, 1969
Enlinia bredini Robinson, 1975
Enlinia brevipes Robinson, 1969
Enlinia caburnica (Botosaneanu & Vaillant, 1973)
Enlinia californica Robinson & Arnaud, 1970
Enlinia cataractarum Robinson, 1975
Enlinia caudata Robinson, 1969
Enlinia chaetophora Robinson, 1969
Enlinia chilensis Runyon & Pollet, 2019
Enlinia ciliata Robinson, 1964
Enlinia ciliifemorata Robinson, 1969
Enlinia clavulifera Robinson, 1969
Enlinia colossicornis Runyon & Pollet, 2018
Enlinia convergens Robinson, 1969
Enlinia crassipes Robinson, 1975
Enlinia crassitibia Robinson, 1975
Enlinia crinita Robinson, 1969
Enlinia cristata Robinson, 1969
Enlinia dalensi Runyon & Pollet, 2018
Enlinia distincta Robinson, 1969
Enlinia dominicensis Robinson, 1975
Enlinia elegans Robinson, 1969
Enlinia elongata Robinson, 1969
Enlinia enormis Runyon & Pollet, 2019
Enlinia escambraica Botosaneanu & Vaillant, 1973
Enlinia exigua Robinson, 1969
Enlinia farri Robinson, 1975
Enlinia fasciata Robinson, 1969
Enlinia femorata Robinson, 1969
Enlinia fimbriata Robinson, 1969
Enlinia flavicornis Robinson, 1969
Enlinia frontalis Robinson, 1969
Enlinia fusca Robinson, 1969
Enlinia halteralis Robinson, 1969
Enlinia hirtipes Robinson, 1969
Enlinia hirtitarsis Robinson, 1969
Enlinia interrupta Robinson, 1969
Enlinia isoloba Runyon & Pollet, 2019
Enlinia jamaicensis Robinson, 1975
Enlinia lamellata Robinson, 1969
Enlinia larondei Robinson, 1975
Enlinia latifacies Robinson, 1969
Enlinia latipennis Robinson, 1969
Enlinia lobata Robinson, 1969
Enlinia loboptera Runyon & Pollet, 2018
Enlinia maculata Robinson, 1969
Enlinia magistri (Aldrich, 1932)
Enlinia magnicornis Robinson, 1969
Enlinia marginata Robinson, 1969
Enlinia maxima Robinson, 1969
Enlinia media Robinson, 1969
Enlinia mitarakensis Runyon & Pollet, 2018
Enlinia montana Robinson, 1969
Enlinia nigricans Robinson, 1969
Enlinia obovata Robinson, 1969
Enlinia ornata Robinson, 1969
Enlinia panamensis Robinson, 1975
Enlinia patellitarsis Robinson, 1975
Enlinia piedrana Botosaneanu & Vaillant, 1973
Enlinia plumicauda Robinson, 1969
Enlinia ramosa Robinson, 1969
Enlinia robinsoni Steyskal, 1975
Enlinia saxicola Robinson, 1964
Enlinia scabrida Robinson, 1969
Enlinia scutitarsis Robinson, 1969
Enlinia seriata Robinson, 1969
Enlinia seticauda Robinson, 1969
Enlinia setosa Robinson, 1969
Enlinia simplex Robinson, 1969
Enlinia sordidus (Aldrich, 1896)
Enlinia spinimana Botosaneanu & Vaillant, 1973
Enlinia taeniocaudata Robinson & Arnaud, 1970
Enlinia texana Robinson, 1973
Enlinia tibialis Robinson, 1969
Enlinia touroulti Runyon & Pollet, 2018
Enlinia tuberosa Botosaneanu & Vaillant, 1973
Enlinia unisetosa Robinson, 1969
Enlinia ventralis Robinson, 1969
Enlinia wirthi Robinson, 1975

Enlinia edwardsae (Van Duzee, 1930) (originally from Achalcus) is now a synonym of Australachalcus edwardsae (Van Duzee, 1930)

References 

Dolichopodidae genera
Enliniinae
Diptera of North America
Diptera of South America
Taxa named by John Merton Aldrich